Maja e Veleçikut is a peak in Albania, part of the Albanian Alps. It is 1,725m high and is found in the western part of the range, near Lake Scutari and the border with Montenegro.

Mountains of Albania
Accursed Mountains